The Mark 12 torpedo was a destroyer-launched anti-surface ship torpedo used by the United States Navy in World War II. It was developed and manufactured by the Naval Torpedo Station in Newport, Rhode Island, which built 200 units. The Mark 12 was similar to the Mark 11 torpedo, but with a lower high speed setting of 44 knots versus 46 knots.

See also
American 21 inch torpedo

References 

Torpedoes of the United States
World War II naval weapons